Danthoniastrum is a genus of Balkan and Caucasian plants in the grass family.

 Species 
 Danthoniastrum brevidentatum H.Scholz - Kosovo, Albania
 Danthoniastrum compactum (Boiss. & Heldr.) Holub - Greece
 Danthoniastrum kolakovskyi Tzvelev - Bulgaria, Republic of Georgia
 Danthoniastrum neumayerianum (Vis.) Tzvelev - Croatia, Montenegro

References 

 GrassBase entry
 USDA Germplasm Resources Information Network (GRIN) entry

Pooideae
Poaceae genera